Donald St. P. Richards (born 1955, in Mandeville, Jamaica) is an American statistician conducting research on multivariate statistics, zonal polynomials, distance correlation, total positivity, and hypergeometric functions of matrix argument. He currently serves as a distinguished professor of statistics at the Pennsylvania State University, and is a Fellow of the Institute of Mathematical Statistics and a Fellow of the American Mathematical Society.

Richards obtained his PhD in 1978 at the University of the West Indies, where the statistician Rameshwar D. Gupta was his doctoral advisor.
In 1999, he was elected a Fellow of the Institute of Mathematical Statistics.
In 2012, he was elected a Fellow of the American Mathematical Society.

Personal life
Richards became an American citizen in 1990.  He was married to Mercedes Richards, an American Jamaican-born professor of astronomy and astrophysics, until her death in 2016.

References

External links

1955 births
Living people
American statisticians
Jamaican statisticians
Pennsylvania State University faculty
Fellows of the Institute of Mathematical Statistics
Fellows of the American Mathematical Society